Lachlan David Morton (born 2 January 1992) is an Australian professional road racing cyclist and mountain biker, who currently rides for UCI WorldTeam .

Career
Born and raised in Port Macquarie, New South Wales, Australia, Morton spent the 2011 and 2012 seasons in the  squad's development stable, .

Following a successful 2016 season including stage and overall wins at the Tour of the Gila and the Tour of Utah, in September 2016  confirmed that Morton would join them for 2017, reuniting him with former Garmin teammate Ben King. He was named in the startlist for the 2017 Vuelta a España. In October 2020, he was named in the startlist for the 2020 Giro d'Italia.

Ultra-distance cycling

Morton has participated in a number of ultra-distance cycling events and challenges. In 2014 he completed a  ride from Port Macquarie to Uluru with his brother Angus Morton. The brothers made a documentary film about the ride titled "Thereabouts". In 2015 "Thereabouts Reprise" was released about a  ride across the Colorado Rockies that Morton completed with his brother, and professional cyclists Taylor Phinney and Cameron Wurf. In 2017 the Morton brothers released a third documentary titled "Thereabouts Colombia" about cycling in Colombia.

In 2019 Morton participated in the Dirty Kanza, Leadville 100, GBDuro and Three Peaks Cyclocross races as part of EF Pro Cycling's alternative calendar. He was first to finish the 2019 GBDuro, a  challenge from Land's End to John o' Groats in the United Kingdom. In May 2020 he set a new record of 11 hours and 14 minutes for the  Kokopelli's Trail in the United States. In September 2020 he won the Badlands, a 700 kilometre race across the Iberian Peninsula.

Everesting
Morton held the Everesting world record, completing the feat in 7:29:57 on 20 June 2020. The feat garnered significant publicity, as Morton had made an attempt just days earlier which was disqualified by Hells 500, who stated that he had not reached the threshold to count as an Everesting.  Since then, Alberto Contador and three other riders have surpassed Morton's time.

2021 Alt Tour
In 2021, Morton completed an "Alt Tour", riding the entire 2021 Tour de France route, including transfers, unsupported in aid of World Bicycle Relief. He started in Brittany on the same day as the regular Tour, but built up a lead on the peloton by riding for 12 hours a day. After  and 16 days, he finished the ride in Paris about 5 days ahead of the peloton.

Major results

2009
 5th Time trial, National Junior Road Championships
2010
 1st  Overall Tour de l'Abitibi
1st Stages 3 (ITT) & 6
 7th Overall Tour of Utah
2011
 2nd Overall Cascade Cycling Classic
 3rd Overall Tour of the Gila
 6th Overall Tour de Langkawi
 7th Overall Giro do Interior de São Paulo
2012
 6th Overall Tour de Guadeloupe
1st  Young rider classification
 8th Overall Giro della Valle d'Aosta
2013
 Tour of Utah
1st  Young rider classification
1st Stage 3
 5th Overall USA Pro Cycling Challenge
1st  Young rider classification
2015
 1st Mount Evans Hill Climb
 5th Overall USA Pro Cycling Challenge
 9th Overall Tour de Beauce
 10th Overall Tour of Utah
2016
 1st  Overall Tour of Utah
1st Stages 3 & 7
 1st  Overall Tour of the Gila
1st Stage 1
 1st Stage 4 Tour de Hokkaido
 4th Overall Tour de Beauce
2017
 7th Overall Tour of California
1st  Young rider classification
 8th Overall Tour of Oman
2019
 1st GBDURO
 1st Stage 5 Tour of Utah
 3rd Leadville Trail 100 MTB
 4th Dirty Kanza 200
2021
 1st Telluride 100 MTB
 2nd Leadville Trail 100 MTB

Grand Tour general classification results timeline

References

External links

Garmin-Sharp: Lachlan Morton

1992 births
Living people
Australian male cyclists
People from the Mid North Coast
Cyclists from New South Wales
People from Port Macquarie